The Bruce-Donaldson House is a historic two-story house in Yankton, South Dakota. It was built in 1879 for James E. Bruce, who sold it to Fred Donaldson, an immigrant from Sweden who became a grocer in Yankton. It was designed in the Italianate architectural style. It has been listed on the National Register of Historic Places since March 5, 1982.

References

National Register of Historic Places in Yankton County, South Dakota
Italianate architecture in South Dakota
Houses completed in 1879
1879 establishments in Dakota Territory